Pasang or Pa Sang may refer to:

Pasang (game), a board game from Brunei
Basang or Pasang, a Tibetan-Chinese politician
Pasang or pesang, regional names for Durio graveolens

Places
Pasang-e Bala, Iran
Pasang-e Pain, Iran
Pa Sang, Mae Chan, Thailand
Pa Sang, Lamphun, Thailand
Pa Sang, Wiang Chiang Rung, Thailand